Putinisation, a term popularised by Martin Schulz, President of the European Parliament,  is a perceived movement away from liberal democracy in certain Eastern European countries in imitation of the regime of Vladimir Putin in Russia. The process of reforming from an authoritarian rule to a liberal democracy is known as deputinisation.

Background

Poland
In January 2016, Schulz used the term to characterise the Constitutional Court crisis then engulfing Poland, warning of a "dangerous Putinisation of European politics". This referred to actions by the ruling Polish Law and Justice (PiS) attempts to change the makeup and voting rules of the Constitutional Court. Protesters against the reforms carried banners reading “We say no to being Putinized!” The BBC's Newsnight programme subsequently broadcast a segment asking 'Is Poland being Putinised?' which drew complaints from the Polish Foreign Ministry. The claims of "Putinisation" in Poland has been controversial, unlike other right-wing populist parties in Europe, the PiS have longtime of anti-Russian policy stances.

Beyond Poland
The term has also been used to describe the national populist regime of Hungary's Viktor Orbán and the attempts by Turkey's President Recep Tayyip Erdoğan to increase the power of the presidency. It has also been applied to an "intensifying campaign" against human rights organisations in Israel by the government of Benjamin Netanyahu.

The Georgian Human Rights Centre has complained of the "Putinization" of media outlets in Georgia in the early 2000s.

Deputinisation

Russia
Since the 2022 Russian invasion of Ukraine, the concept of deputinising Russia has become more recognised and advocated for. Specifically, it entails putting an end to Putin's political influence completely, demilitarising Russia, and reducing the power of Russian oligarchs. Petro Poroshenko, the former president of Ukraine, has called for the world to "stop Russian exports not only in the EU, UK, and US, but also in other nations."

Beyond Russia
Latvian minister Artis Pabriks has suggested that all of Europe must deputinise to "break free from Russia's influence," beginning with Ukraine joining the European Union.

See also
 Illiberal democracy
 Populism 
 Democratic backsliding 
 Presidency of Vladimir Putin
 Putinism

References

Authoritarianism
Democracy
Political terminology
Vladimir Putin